Levanger is a municipality in Trøndelag county, Norway.

Levanger may also refer to:

Places
Levanger (town), a town in the municipality of Levanger in Trøndelag county, Norway
Levanger landsogn, a former municipality (1856–1962) in Trøndelag county, Norway
Levanger Church, a church in the municipality of Levanger in Trøndelag county, Norway
Levanger Hospital, a hospital serving the Innherred region of Trøndelag county, Norway
Levanger Station, a railway station in Trøndelag county, Norway
Levanger, a dialect-specific name for the locality of Lövånger in Skellefteå Municipality, Västerbotten County, Sweden

Other
Levanger FK, a Norwegian football club located in Levanger, Norway
Levanger-Avisa, a newspaper serving the Levanger area in Trøndelag county, Norway

See also
 Levinger (disambiguation)